Annalie Antonia Longo (born 1 July 1991) is an association football player who represents New Zealand at international level.
She has played for Sydney FC and Melbourne Victory in the Australian W-League. From her time in the W-League with Melbourne Victory, Longo is dubbed the Kiwi Messi by the fans for her ability on the ball and goalscoring prowess.

Early life
Longo got into football when she used to go with her dad, Paul, to watch her brothers, Jason and Julian, play for Eden Football Club. She joined the club which merged with Mt Roskill to become Three Kings United.

Club career

Three Kings United
Longo played for Three Kings United from when she first started playing football through all childhood and also while playing for Epsom Girls and training with the Wynton Rufer Soccer School of Excellence. She made her debut for Three Kings United senior women's football team in the Northern Premier Women's League in 2004.

Epsom Girls' Grammar School
Longo played football at Epsom Girls' Grammar School for their first XI, winning the NZ Secondary Schoolgirls tournament in 2008 with future international teammates Anna Green and Hannah Wall. This was after the team won the Auckland provincial championships unbeaten.

Wynton Rufer Soccer School of Excellence
Longo was part of Wynton Rufer Soccer School of Excellence (WYNRS) from 1999 to 2006.

Melbourne Victory
On 25 October 2019, Longo signed a one-year deal with Melbourne Victory to return to the Australian W-League. She made her first appearance for Victory in their 3–2 win over the Brisbane Roar, playing 74 minutes before getting subbed off in the second half. In September 2021, it was announced that Longo wouldn't return to Melbourne Victory for the 2021–22 W-League season.

International career

U-17
She scored New Zealand's first goal at the 2008 inaugural FIFA U-17 Women's World Cup although they were effectively eliminated from contention in the 1–2 loss to Denmark, having previously lost 0–1 to Canada in the opening game.

U-20
Longo also represented New Zealand at the 2006 Women's U-20 World Cup finals where she played in all three games.

Longo was again included in the U-20 squad for the 2008 Women's U-20 World Cup finals to be played in Chile, featuring in two of their three group games. In 2010, she represented New Zealand at a third Under-20 World Cup, this time in Germany, appearing in all three group games.

National team
Longo at age 15, made her Football Ferns debut in a 0–3 loss to China PR on 14 November 2006, becoming New Zealand's youngest senior football international. She then went on to represent New Zealand at the 2007 FIFA Women's World Cup finals in China, where they lost to Brazil 0–5, Denmark (0–2) and China PR (0–2). Longo is the second youngest player to represent any country at a senior FIFA World Cup.

She played one of New Zealand's three matches in the 2011 FIFA Women's World Cup in Germany and all three matches of her country at the 2015 FIFA Women's World Cup in Canada.  She also competed for New Zealand at both the 2012 and 2016 Olympics.

Longo made her 100th appearance for New Zealand in a friendly against the United States in September 2017 and is the first player in the world to
compete at all U17, U20, Women's World Cup and Olympic Games tournaments.

International goals

Personal life
She was a student at Auckland's Epsom Girls' Grammar School. In footballing circles, she is known by the nickname "flea".

In an interview Longo gave in November 2014, she said she lives in Kaiapoi but also spends half of her week in Auckland for national trainings. While in Kaiapoi, she plays for Canterbury United Pride and then spends the rest of her time coaching at the Grasshopper Soccer programme – a non-competitive programme for kids aged 2–10 years, where the focus is on fun and skill development. She said that she
enjoyed working with young children and enjoyed watching them develop.

Honours

High school
NZ Secondary Schoolgirls champions: 2008

Club
Three Kings United
Northern Premier Women's League runner-ups: 2004, 2010
Northern Premier Women's League winners: 2006, 2007
Women's Knockout Cup runner-ups: 2004, 2010
Women's Knockout Cup winners: 2012

Auckland Football Federation
National Women's League champions

'''Canterbury United Pride
National Women's League champions

International
OFC U-19 Women's Championship: 2006, 2010

Personal
2007 ASB Bank Young Sportsperson of the Year
Finalist, International Women's Young Player of the Year
Finalist, Auckland Junior Sportswoman of the Year
National U-14 Girls Tournament Golden Boot: 2005

References

External links
 
 Profile at NZF
 NZ U-17s Caps 'n' Goals at Ultimate NZ Soccer 
 NZ U-20s Caps 'n' Goals at Ultimate NZ Soccer
 Football Ferns Caps 'n' Goals at Ultimate NZ Soccer
 

1991 births
Living people
New Zealand women's association footballers
2011 FIFA Women's World Cup players
2015 FIFA Women's World Cup players
Footballers at the 2012 Summer Olympics
Olympic association footballers of New Zealand
Sydney FC (A-League Women) players
Melbourne Victory FC (A-League Women) players
People educated at Epsom Girls' Grammar School
Association footballers from Auckland
New Zealand women's international footballers
Footballers at the 2016 Summer Olympics
2007 FIFA Women's World Cup players
Women's association football midfielders
2019 FIFA Women's World Cup players
FIFA Century Club
Footballers at the 2020 Summer Olympics
Expatriate women's soccer players in Australia
New Zealand expatriate women's association footballers
New Zealand expatriate sportspeople in Australia